Kulvaddhu (English: Daughter-In-Law), is an Indian television drama serial produced by Anuj Saxena's production house, Maverick Productions. It first aired on Sony TV on 25 December 2006 and ended three months after its launch date.

Cast
 Dalljiet Kaur as Niyati Chauhan / Niyati Shaurya Singh Rathore
 Imran Mashkoor Khan / Sachin Sharma as Shaurya Singh Rathore
 Kitu Gidwani as Antara Vikram Singh Rathore
 Milind Gunaji as Vikram Singh Rathore
 Suhasini Mulay as Vasundhara Singh Rathore
 Seema Bhargava as Padma Chauhan
 Shaleen Bhanot as Agni
 Rajesh Kumar as Jaswant Singh Rathore
 Sonali Verma as Damyanti Jaswant Singh Rathore
 Sushmita Mukherjee as Rajlaxmi Singh Rathore
 Rituraj Singh as Amit Sahay
 Ayaz Khan as Rajveer Singh Rathore 
 Surbhi Tiwari as Sanyukta Samar Singh Rathore 
 Chetan Pandit as Samar Singh Rathore 
 Manasi Varma as Janvi
 Nisha Sareen as Carol Rajveer Singh Rathore
 Shweta Gautam as Bindiya
 Chinky Jaiswal as Child Niyati Chauhan
 Paritosh Sand as Upendra
 Anup Upadhyay as Sri Mohan Sevak (S.M.S.)
 Raja Kapse as Vishal Singh
 Pankaj Kalra as Inspector
 Tarun Khanna as Advocate Dhanraj Singhania
 Manish Khanna as Advocate
 Arun Mathur as Judge

References

2006 Indian television series debuts
2007 Indian television series endings
Sony Entertainment Television original programming
Indian drama television series